Samšín is a municipality and village in Pelhřimov District in the Vysočina Region of the Czech Republic. It has about 200 inhabitants.

Administrative parts
The village of Přáslavice is an administrative parts of Samšín.

References

Villages in Pelhřimov District